= Ladislaus Chernac =

Hungarian mathematician

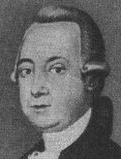
L. Chernac

Ladislaus Chernac (1742–1816) was a Hungarian scientist who moved to Deventer in the Netherlands. He is the author of the first published table giving decompositions in prime factors up to one million.

== Biography ==
László Csernák was born in Hungary in 1742. He went to school in Debrecen, and then continued to study in Vienna, Basel, and Turin. He eventually went to the Netherlands.

== Works ==
- Ladislaus Chernac: Cribrum arithmeticum, 1811, https://gdz.sub.uni-goettingen.de/dms/load/img/?PPN=PPN591322250
